Hellfire, also known as Blood Song, is a 1995 American made-for-television horror film directed by David Tausik and starring Ben Cross. It was part of the Roger Corman Presents series. It was filmed in Russia.

Plot summary
In the XVIII century, Aristocratic composer Octave Barron wrote a symphony for the Devil as part of a satanic pact. During his work Barron is "inspired" by murders he commits with the help of his lover and maid, Carlotta. For his crimes and devil worshiping Barron is taken out of his mansion by an angry mop of townsfolk and torn apart with horses.

Years later his niece Gabriella (Jennifer Burns) inherits the estate and discovers the symphony. Believing all the stories about her late uncle are nothing more than superstition, she hires the church choir director and novice composer Marius (Ben Cross) to finish the symphony. In the process Carlotta, now an old woman and secret practitioner of witchcraft, is contacted by his master's spirit from hell, who directs her in how to bring him back in the body of Marius. Marius, possessed by Barron's evil spirit, murders two women for "inspiration" to finish the symphony, while Carlotta secretly helps him to scape and create alibis. Things get tense when Gabriella's fiancé Julien arrives, clashing with Marius and showing jealousy. Carlotta poisons Julien to make him extremely angry and as a result he tries to rape Gabriella and challenges Marius to a duel. During the duel, Marius becomes possessed again by Barron's spirit after listening to the symphony being played by Carlotta, and in that state he defeats and kills Julien.

Fearing for the worst, Marius tries to leave Gabriella's mansion, but before doing so Carlotta commits suicide, as instructed by Barron. Later, as Marius finishes the symphony he's taken again by the spirit of Barron and Gabriella by Carlotta's spirit. They both have sex even as their reflections show that they're possessed. Soon after Carlotta's spirit leaves Gabriella's body and she goes to hell as punishment for her suicide and crimes, as Barron intended from the beginning. Barron plans to live in full control of Marius body, but Gabriella confronts her uncle while the police and townspeople storm the place, seeking retribution for the third murder committed by Marius/Barron. A fight between the possessed Marius and Gabrielle ensues, and Marius regains conscience just before the police and the crowd arrive where they are. Knowing that there is no escape from the mental and physical hold Barron has over him, Marius throws himself into the fireplace and burns alive, therefore releasing the spirit of Barron from his body, and tragically dying while saving his mind and soul.

Nevertheless, that very same night, when everyone but Gabriella has left the mansion, Barron resurrects his dead body and comes out of the grave. Gabriella realizes she and Marius forgot to destroy the symphony that powers Barron. Gabriella then manages to survive by burning the symphony and Barron's piano, while the helpless Barron can only sit and play a few last moments at the burning piano before finally dying, this time forever. The next day, Gabriella closes all the doors to the estate and travels alone. Briefly looking back, she leaves the place, never to return.

Cast
 Ben Cross as Marius Carnot
 Jennifer Burns as Gabrielle Apollinaire
 Beverly Garland as Carlotta
 Doug Wert as Julien
 Lev Prygunov as Baron Jean Octavie / Octave Barron
 Vladimir Kuleshov as Tristan
 Yekaterina Rednikova as Yvette
 Irina Lachina as Young Carlotta
 Aleksandr Pyatkov as Constable
 Yelena Bardina as Louise
 Elena Kostina as Celeste
 Vasily Rybin as 1st Deputy (as Vasiliy Rybin)
 Gleb Plaksin as Henri (as Gleb Plaxin)
 Vladimir Vozhenikov as The Archbishop
 Pavel Ostroukhov as Young Priest
 Svetlana Andropova as 1st Prostitute

References

External links
 
 Hellfire at TCMDB

1995 films
Films produced by Roger Corman
Films set in country houses
1995 television films
1995 horror films
American horror television films
1990s English-language films
1990s American films